Liberty cap most often refers to:

Phrygian cap or pileus (hat), emblematic of a slave's manumission in classical antiquity

Liberty cap may also refer to:
Liberty Cap (California), a granite dome in Yosemite National Park

Liberty Cap, a prominent peak on Mount Rainier
Liberty cap (Psilocybe semilanceata), a psilocybin mushroom
Liberty Cap half cent, an early coin of the United States dollar
Liberty Cap large cent, an early coin of the United States dollar